The fusion of Italian municipalities (Italian: fusione di comuni) is the physical-territorial union between two or more contiguous comuni.

The following list contains only the municipalities that are within the present-day borders of Italy.

Fusion of municipalities from the Unification of Italy 
Note: in bold the provincial capitals

Fusion of municipalities between 1861 and 1946

Fusion of municipalities since 1946

Upcoming fusions (already approved)  

1º January 2022
Nuova Pescara (PE) (Montesilvano, Pescara and Spoltore) - Population 193.697

Undefined date

References

Italy
 
Subdivisions of Italy